Eugen Systems is a French video game developer based in Paris, France. It was founded in January 2000 by the brothers Alexis Le Dressay, a DPLG architect, and Cedric Le Dressay, a software engineer. The company currently focuses on developing real-time strategy games for the PC and Macintosh platforms, but also has developed games for the PlayStation 3 and Xbox 360 in the past.

List of video games

2018 Labour Strike
On February 14, 2018, a statement was released through Le Syndicat des Travailleurs et Travailleuses du Jeu Vidéo (STJV, Union of Video Game Workers) in which 21 out of 44 workers claimed that Eugen Systems had denied overtime pay, delayed paychecks, reduced gross wages below French minimum wage requirements, and failed to honour contractual and collectively bargained obligations, and that they were going on strike until their demands were met. Eugen Systems released a statement denying the majority of these allegations, but admitting to two instances of delayed payrolls due to technical issues, rather than malicious intent. STJV set up a crowdfunding campaign to raise money to support the employees on strike. A statement from STJV a week later indicated that the strike was representative of a deeper lack of respect within the video game industry of programmers' experience and other abilities. Employees who were on strike met at each other's homes to support each other and plan meetings with the press, labour advocates, and politicians.

Staff representative Félix Habert stated that it took two weeks for Eugen Systems leadership to approached him and others to resolve the issue and the first meeting did not take place until March 5.  A statement from STJV about this meeting stated that Eugen Systems denied that the employees' contracts were accurate or enforceable, and that the following day they sent a proposal for ending the strike that was "incomplete" and "not serious."

French Deputy Sébastien Leclerc spoke out against the strike in favour of Eugen Systems, saying that the strike was motivated by the "political positioning" of the strikers and calling it a "hostage taking". Le Monde later revealed that Leclerc and the wife of Cedric Le Dressay, one of the co-founders of Eugen Systems, were politically connected and that she was one of his supporters during the 2017 election campaign, creating a conflict of interest in dealing with the strike.

On April 3, 2018, the strike was ended by employees saying: "We do not think we will gain any additional ground with this strike, despite the fact our grievances are simply about conforming to labour laws and collective labour agreements". Fifteen of the 21 employees sought to take their grievances to the French Labour Court. The website for collecting donations was shut down a few days after this announcement.

References

External links
Official website
Eugen Systems profile at MobyGames

Companies based in Paris
French companies established in 2000
Video game companies established in 2000
Video game companies of France
Video game development companies